Universiti Malaysia Perlis (abbreviated as UniMAP) is a Malaysian public institution of higher learning located in Perlis. It was previously known as Kolej Universiti Kejuruteraan Utara Malaysia (Northern Malaysia University College of Engineering, abbreviated as KUKUM). It was established as the 17th Public Institution of Higher Learning in Malaysia on 25 July 2001. The first Vice-Chancellor is YBhg. Datuk Prof. Emeritus Dr. Kamarudin Hussin and the current Vice-Chancellor is YBhg. Lt Kol Prof. Ts. Dr. Zaliman Sauli. On 7 February 2007, KUKUM was upgraded to a full-fledged university and got its present name. Its logo, used since 2003, was rehashed as the logo of the University.

History
UniMAP began its operations at a temporary campus in Kubang Gajah, Arau, Perlis on 2 May 2002. Curriculum development, physical development and recruitment activities began shortly after the appointment of the Vice-Chancellor and the Deputy Vice-Chancellor on 16 February 2002. The first intake of 119 students for the academic session 2002/2003 began on 20 June 2002.

Initially offering two programmes, UniMAP now offers six diploma programmes, 37 Bachelor's Degree programmes, 20 Master's Degree programmes and twelve Doctor of Philosophy programmes for almost 10,000 students. Located in the north of Peninsular Malaysia, UniMAP has a distributed campus with 30 locations across the state of Perlis.

Locations
UniMAP permanent campus covers three locations:
 City Campus accommodates the School of Environmental Engineering, School of Bioprocess Engineering, School of Business Innovation & Technopreneurship and School of Human Development & Techno-Communication.
It accommodates the School of Manufacturing Engineering, School of Mechatronic Engineering, School of Microelectronic Engineering, School of Computer and Communication Engineering and the School of Electrical Systems Engineering. Also on the campus are the Engineering Centre, Centre for Industrial and Governmental Collaboration, Institute of Engineering Mathematics, the lecture hall complex, the multipurpose hall, residential colleges developed through a private finance initiative, an international-class go-kart circuit and the Syed Sirajuddin Areeb Putra Sports Complex.
It houses the Faculty of Engineering Technology, a residential college, and the institute of Sustainable Agrotechnology (INSAT) which runs nine greenhouses including two dedicated to Harumanis mango research.

Administrative organisation
The first and current Chancellor is the DYTM Tuanku Syed Faizuddin Putra Ibni Tuanku Syed Sirajuddin Jamalullail who was appointed on 1 September 2003 by the Seri Paduka Baginda Yang Dipertuan Agong. The Pro Chancellor is the DYTM Raja Puan Muda Perlis, Tuanku Hajjah Lailatul Shareen Akashah Khalil.

The University Board of Directors is chaired by Yang Berbahagia Datuk Prof Emeritus Dr Kamarudin Hussin. UniMAP's management is helmed by a Vice Chancellor appointed by the Minister of Higher Education and is aided by three Deputy Vice-Chancellors, namely the Deputy Vice-Chancellors of Academic and International, Research and Innovation, and Student Affairs and Alumni. The Registrar, the Bursar and the Head Librarian also make up UniMAP's top management.

Rankings

Partner Institution

Malaysia 

 Universiti Tun Hussein Onn Malaysia (UTHM)
 Universiti Teknikal Malaysia Melaka (UTeM)
 Universiti Malaysia Pahang (UMP)

See also
 List of universities in Malaysia

References

External links 
 Universiti Malaysia Perlis

Universities and colleges in Perlis
Public universities in Malaysia
Educational institutions established in 2001
Technical universities and colleges in Malaysia
Engineering universities and colleges in Malaysia
Information technology schools in Malaysia
2001 establishments in Malaysia